Events from the year 1973 in Denmark.

Incumbents
 Monarch – Margrethe II
 Prime minister – Anker Jørgensen (until 19 December), Poul Hartling

Events 
 1 January – Denmark joins European Communities.
 4 December – 1973 Danish parliamentary election is held, it is later to become known as the Landslide Election, because 5 new parties got elected, and more than half the members of the parliament were replaced.

Sports

Badminton
 1217 March  1973 Denmark Open
Elo Hansen and Ulla Strand win gold in mized double.

Handball
 1 May  GOG Håndbold is founded.

Births
 4 January – Frank Høj, cyclist
 24 March – Mette Jacobsen, freestyle and butterfly swimmer
 29 March – Kasper Holten, stage director
 29 April – Yildiz Akdogan, politician
 25 September – Jakob Ellemann-Jensen, politician

Deaths
 9 April – Sigurd Swane, painter (born 1879)
 1 May – Asger Jorn, painter (born 1914)
 9 August – Christian Arhoff, actor (born 1893)

See also
1973 in Danish television

References

 
Denmark
Years of the 20th century in Denmark
1970s in Denmark
Denmark